The Wyrmling Horde is an epic fantasy novel by American writer David Farland, the  seventh novel in his series The Runelords. It was published on September 16, 2008.

Plot introduction
The Wyrmling Horde is an epic fantasy novel set in a land where men can bestow to each other a number of endowments, granting the recipient of the endowment attributes such as increased strength, a more acute sense of hearing, or better eyesight.  The novel combines traditional sword and sorcery elements of fantasy with its own unique magic system of endowments.

Plot summary
Vulgnash delivers Fallion to Lord Despair, who tortures human beings and then endows Fallion with a rune of compassion from each person, effectively transferring their pain to him. In a flashback it is revealed that when Yaleen shattered the world, all of the Bright Ones traced the rune of compassion on her cheek, punishing her. This pain eventually broke her, converting her into Lord Despair. However, Fallion refuses to break; to prevent him from using his flameweaving skills, Vulgnash keeps him nearly frozen. Meanwhile, the wyrmling, Cullossax, is charged with delivering an unruly wyrmling girl, Kirissa, to Vulgnash so he can feed on her soul, but instead he helps her to escape—eventually giving his life to stop her pursuers. Daylan Hammer takes the leaderless humans of Caer Luciare to the world of the Bright Ones for a brief respite, but it is more fraught with danger than they'd imagined. It is revealed that Daylan was banished for teaching rune lore to the inhabitants of shadow worlds. Despite this, the humans manage to forge an alliance with some of the Bright Ones, led by Erringale, after revealing that the True Tree and an Earth King are found on Fallion's shadow world. The Bright Ones warn them that killing another person damages your soul, no matter what your motive was for taking their life. Some of the humans begin taking endowments, including Talon and the Emir (who many fear will become a new Raj Ahten). Talon steals some sunstones from the Bright Ones' habitation. On the shadow world Rhianna flies to the Courts of Tide, seeking an alliance to prevent the wyrmlings from reaching a mountain of blood metal, but they attack her. So she seeks help, instead, from the horse sisters, who welcome her and grant her endowments, turning her into a runelord. The horse sisters capture Kirissa and learn from her where Fallion is being kept. On their way to rescue Fallion, the horse sisters take over Beldinook. Lord Despair also begins taking endowments, from his human prisoners, and must also grapple with the benevolent influence of the Earth Spirit. To spite the Earth Spirit, he chooses the most evil of his followers for the Earth; he also chooses Fallion so he can keep track of him. Despair also brings awful creatures, called the Thiss, from another world to help him in his conquest of all the shadow worlds. However, he is low on blood metal because the Fang Guards at Caer Luciare have Rhianna's rune staff and have decided to rebel against Lord Despair. Vulgnash is sent to subdue them, which he quickly and easily does. When Talon and the Emir return to their shadow world, the Emir begins to develop his abilities as a flameweaver. Erringale comes with him and he and the wizard Sisel set out in search of the True Tree; when they find it they are dismayed to see that it has been cursed and is dead. Talon and the Emir meet up with Rhianna and the horse sisters. Kirissa agrees to go back so that Rhianna can track her to where Fallion is being held. However, in their attack on the wyrmling stronghold they are tricked by Despair—the Earth had warned him they were coming—and only Rhianna escapes. Determined to go back and rescue Fallion and the others, Rhianna realizes that she must evade Despair's Earth senses by not harming any of the wyrmlings he has chosen for the Earth. In this way she is able to re-enter the wyrmling keep, free her friends, and help them to escape. As soon as Despair realizes what has happened, he sends Vulgnash after them. The wizard Sisel confronts Vulgnash, but rather than destroy him he turns Vulgnash mortal. Nevertheless, Fallion realizes he's been chosen by Despair and so cannot truly escape—Despair will always know where he is. So Fallion exchanges endowments of wit with the Emir, promising to teach him the rune for binding worlds, and then subjects himself to Vulgnash who takes him back to Despair. Despair opens a rift in the fabric of the world, letting in thousands of Darlking Glories.

Main characters
Fallion: Gaborn Val Orden's oldest son, an immortal (Bright One) flameweaver known as the Torchbearer.
Rhianna: A young woman who is in love with Fallion.
Talon: Daughter of Sir Borenson and Lady Myrrima.
Emir of Dalharristan: The shadow world equivalent of Raj Ahten
Vulgnash: Leader of the undead Knights Eternal
Daylan Hammer: A legendary immortal (Bright One) who keeps watch over several shadow worlds
Lord Despair/Queen of the Loci/The One True Master of Evil/The Great Wyrm/Yaleen: Fallion's enemy, the immortal who shattered the One True World, now inhabiting the body of:
Prince Areth Urstone: The shadow world equivalent of Fallion's father, Gaborn val Orden, and the Earth King

Minor characters
Cullossax the Tormentor: renegade Wyrmling 
Kirissa Mentarn: Bound wyrmling, previously an Inkarran
Siyaddah: The Emir's stunningly beautiful daughter
Drewish and Connor: Lord Madoc's scheming sons
Alun: Master of the Dogs who becomes an unlikely hero during the battles with the wyrmlings
Emperor Zul-torac: Leader of the wyrmlings
Princess Kan-hazur: Daughter of Zul-torac, princess of the wyrmlings
The Cormar Twins: Two humans who endow wit to each other, becoming a single mind
Alliona Lowicker: Queen of Beldinook
Chulspeth: leader of the wyrmling Fang Guards

References

American fantasy novels
Runelords series
2008 American novels
Tor Books books